Empress Qinhuai of the Pucha clan (d. ca. 1186 – 1189, personal name unknown) was the wife of Emperor Zhangzong of Jin, the sixth emperor of the Jurchen-led Jin dynasty of China. She died before he ascended the throne and was made empress posthumously.

Biography
Lady Pucha was from the aristocratic Pucha family, and many of her direct male ancestors held prominent positions in the Jin government. Lady Pucha's father also obtained various hereditary titles and military honours on marrying Princess Zhengguo, a daughter of Emperor Xizong, as befitting an imperial son-in-law.

When Lady Pucha was born, it was reported that her entire body was covered in a red light that did not fade with time. She was raised by her maternal aunt, Princess Yiguo, and when she grew older, she was known as being filial and prudent. 

In 1183, Lady Pucha married Madage of the imperial Wanyan clan, the same year as his elaborate enfeoffment as Prince of Jinyuan, and she was thus given the title Lady of Jinyuan. The History of Jin records that she was later given the title of imperial consort and died, but it does not record the year. She gave birth to a son named Hongyu in 1186.

Legacy
When Madage ascended the throne as Emperor Zhangzong in January 1189, he gave his deceased wife the posthumous title of Empress Qinhuai. With the position of empress empty, he attempted to promote his favoured concubine Li Shi'er to the position. However, previous empresses had all come from the prominent Tudan, Tangkuo, Pucha, Nalanpusan, Hešeri, Wulinda, or Wulungu clans, so Zhangzong's decision met with fervent opposition from his ministers. As a result, Li Shi'er was promoted to Consort Yuan, one rank below empress, and Zhangzong did not instate another empress. 

Early in the reign of Prince Shao of Wei, Empress Qinhuai was buried with her husband in Daoling.

Family
Father: Heshang (和尚), sinicised name Pucha Dingshou (蒲察鼎寿)
Mother: Princess Zhengguo (郑国公主), daughter of Emperor Xizong
Spouse: Emperor Zhangzong of Jin (31 August 1168 – 29 December 1208)
Son: Wanyan Hongyu (1186 – 25 October 1188) (完颜洪裕)

References

12th-century Chinese women
Year of birth unknown
Year of death unknown
Jin dynasty (1115–1234) posthumous empresses